USS Shakori (ATF-162) is an  that saw service during the World War II and Cold War. She was later sold to Republic of China as ROCS Da Tai (ATF-563). Her namesake was a small Indian tribe which originally inhabited an area near the present site of Durham, North Carolina.

Design and description

The ships' complement consisted of 85 officers and ratings.

The ships had two General Motors 12-278A diesel engines, one shaft.

The Abnaki class was armed with a 3"/50 caliber gun anti-aircraft gun, two single-mount Oerlikon 20 mm cannon and two twin-gun mounts for Bofors 40 mm gun.

Construction and career
The ship was built at the Charleston Shipbuilding & Drydock Co. at Charleston, South Carolina. She was laid down on 9 May 1945 and launched on 9 August 1945. The ship was commissioned on 20 December 1945.

Service in the United States Navy 
Since then, the major portion of Shakoris long naval career has been spent in the Atlantic Ocean and in the Caribbean Sea. The tug has performed towing services all along the Atlantic seaboard and has often been called upon to tow targets for naval gunnery exercises.

On three occasions, Shakori has departed from her normal routine. In October and November 1962, during the Cuban missile crisis, she assisted in the evacuation of dependents from Guantanamo Bay by transporting clothes to the evacuees on the high seas. Following that, she spent three weeks at Miami, Florida, as the crisis wore on to its conclusion. The second and third departures from routine came in 1966 and 1967. In 1966, the tug circumnavigated the globe, completing the Navy's second-longest tow, 11,000 miles, en route. In 1967, after returning to Little Creek, Virginia, for overhaul and training, she deployed to the Mediterranean for almost six months on 18 January.

On 3 June 1967, Shakori returned to Little Creek, and resumed her Atlantic-Caribbean towing routine. This she has continued through 1974 and, as of 31 July, is in-port at Little Creek.

Service in the Republic of China Navy 
The ship was decommissioned on 29 December 1980 and later sold to the Republic of China as ROCS Da Tai (ATF-563). She was commissioned later that year on the 15 December.

At about 4 pm, 10 January 2022, the Keelung City Fire Department received a notification from the public that a large amount of smoke was coming from the smoke stack of the Da Tai ship docked at the West 1 pier of Keelung Port; the fire department immediately dispatched fire fighting vehicles. The fire had been extinguished by military personnel on arrival, and no one was injured. The cause of the fire remains to be further investigated and clarified.

Awards 
 Navy Unit Commendation 
 Navy Meritorious Unit Commendation 
 Navy Expeditionary Medal (5 awards) 
 American Campaign Medal 
 World War II Victory Medal 
 National Defense Service Medal (2 awards) 
 Armed Forces Expeditionary Medal (2 awards) 
 Vietnam Service Medal (1 award) 
 Republic of Vietnam Campaign Medal

References

External links
NavSource Online: USS Shakori (ATF-162)
Hull Number : ATF-162 DEPLOYMENTS - MAJOR EVENTS
USS Shakori (ATF-162) Crew List

Shakori
Ships built in Charleston, South Carolina
1945 ships
World War II auxiliary ships of the United States
Cold War auxiliary ships of the United States
Shakori
Maritime incidents in 2022